Melissa Fay McMahon (born 15 May 1976) is an Australian politician. She has been the Labor member for Macalister in the Queensland Legislative Assembly since 2017. She is a member of the Parliamentary Crime and Corruption Committee (PCCC) and the Legal Affairs and Community Safety Committee (LACSC) of the Queensland Parliament.

Career
Prior to her election to the Queensland Parliament, McMahon was a major in the Australian Army working in CIMIC, military police, information operations and career management.  She served overseas in Timor-Leste in 2008 and 2011. She was also a senior sergeant in the Queensland Police Service, having worked on the Gold Coast, Logan and Brisbane.

McMahon has bachelor degrees in behavioural science, policing and secondary education with a diploma of public safety and qualifications in training and education.

In the 2015 Queensland state election she ran in the seat of Albert, gaining a two-party-preferred swing of 10%, but lost to incumbent Mark Boothman.

McMahon is President of the Beenleigh Neighbourhood Centre. She has three children.

References

Parliamentary Profile

1976 births
Living people
Members of the Queensland Legislative Assembly
Australian Labor Party members of the Parliament of Queensland
Women members of the Queensland Legislative Assembly
21st-century Australian politicians
21st-century Australian women politicians